The 1942 Manhattan Jaspers football team was an American football team that represented Manhattan College as an independent during the 1942 college football season.  In its fifth and final season under head coach Herb Kopf, the team compiled a 2–6 record and was outscored by a total of 148 to 63. 

In July 1943, coach Kopf announced that Manhattan was abandoning football due to the manpower shortage resulting from wartime military service. Manhattan's usual enrollment had dropped from 1,000 students to 300 civilians along with 400 Army trainees, with the latter group being prohibited by War Department policy from participating in varsity athletics. Manhattan's decision followed a similar decision announced days earlier by Fordham.

Schedule

References

Manhattan
Manhattan Jaspers football seasons
Manhattan Jaspers football